is a Japanese politician and a former governor of Fukui Prefecture in Japan. He was elected first in 2003. A native of Asahi, Fukui and graduate of Kyoto University with the B.L. degree in 1968, he joined the Ministry of Home Affairs in 1968.

References

External links 
  

1945 births
Living people
Kyoto University alumni
Governors of Fukui Prefecture